Karl Aderhold (30 June 1884, in Stolberg, Province of Saxony – 20 June 1921, in Hanover) was a German politician. He represented the Independent Social Democratic Party of Germany.

The son of a miner, he came from the Harz Mountains, and until 1898 attended elementary school in Stolberg. He then learned the carpentry trade. In 1917 he joined the Independents and from November 1918, Aderhold worked for the Hanoverian Workers' and Soldiers group and represented them until 1919 as deputy chief of police in Hanover's police headquarters. He was a city councilman in Hanover and 1919 was elected to the German constitutional National Assembly. From 1919  until his early death in 1921 he was a Superintendent and member of the Hanoverian Provincial Diet.

See also
List of Independent Social Democratic Party politicians

Literature 
 Dirk Böttcher et al. (ed.): Hannoversches Biographisches Lexikon. Von den Anfängen bis zur Gegenwart. Schlütersche, Hannover 2002, .

External links 
 Karl Aderhold at the Bundes Archiv

1884 births
1921 deaths
People from Stolberg, Saxony-Anhalt
People from the Province of Saxony
Independent Social Democratic Party politicians
Members of the Weimar National Assembly
Members of the Reichstag of the Weimar Republic
German carpenters
German police chiefs